Nizhneyaikbayevo (Tübänge Yayıqbay) is a rural locality (a village) in Nigamatovsky Selsoviet, Baymaksky District, Bashkortostan, Russia. The population was 123 as of 2010. There are 2 streets.

Geography 
Nizhneyaikbayevo is located 32 km northwest of Baymak (the district's administrative centre) by road. Nigamatovo is the nearest rural locality.

References 

Rural localities in Baymaksky District